Andrés Jemio (born 6 July 1976) is a retired Argentine football goalkeeper.

References

1976 births
Living people
Sportspeople from San Miguel de Tucumán
Argentine footballers
Atlético Tucumán footballers
Independiente Rivadavia footballers
The Strongest players
Club Sportivo Ben Hur players
Club Blooming players
Bolivian Primera División players
Association football goalkeepers
Argentine expatriate footballers
Expatriate footballers in Bolivia
Argentine expatriate sportspeople in Bolivia